Hogong was a minister of Silla in the age of nation-building. It is recorded that he was originally from the Wa people of Japan, though his family name or clan name was unknown to the compiler of the Historical Records of the Three Kingdoms. He was called Hogong (meaning "Duke Bottle Gourd") because he was wearing one or more bottle gourds on his waist when he first came across the sea. He was a very important person in initial Silla because he appeared in stories of primogenitors of all royal families.

In 20 BC, Hyeokgeose of Silla (박혁거세) dispatched him to Mahan confederacy. The king of Mahan scolded him on account of the fact that Silla had not sent tribute, but Hogong criticized the king's impoliteness with fortitude. The king became angry at Hogong and tried to kill him, but surrounding subordinates stopped the king, and he was permitted his homecoming.
In 58, he assumed the position of the minister's first rank.
In 65, he discovered Kim Alji, who would become primogenitor of the Kim royal clan of Silla, in the forest of Gyerim.

Popular culture
 Portrayed by Lee Byung-joon in the 2016-2017 KBS2 TV series Hwarang: The Poet Warrior Youth.

References

History of Korea
Silla